Kakma  is a village in Croatia. It is connected by the D503 highway.

Notable natives and residents

Slobodan Uzelac

References

Populated places in Zadar County